The Almand-O'Kelley-Walker House, in Conyers, Georgia, is a historic house built around 1870.  It was listed on the National Register of Historic Places in 1998.

It is a one-story folk Victorian frame house on brick piers.  It has four original chimneys and six original fireplaces.

It has been referred to as a House of Seven Gables.

The listing included three contributing buildings and two contributing structures.

Photos

References

National Register of Historic Places in Rockdale County, Georgia
Houses completed in 1870